This page includes a list of biblical proper names that start with Y in English transcription. Some of the names are given with a proposed etymological meaning. For further information on the names included on the list, the reader may consult the sources listed below in the References and External Links.

A – B – C – D – E – F – G – H – I – J – K – L – M – N – O – P – Q – R – S – T – U – X - [List of biblical names starting with V|V]] – Y – Z

Y
 Yahweh
 Yakob, Yacob - Jacob
 Yasaf - Joseph
 Yehezkel - Ezekiel
 Yehoyada - Jehoida
 Yehu
 Yeshua - Jesus, a Hebrew Bible form of Joshua
 Yoab - Joab
 Yonah - Jonah
 Yuval - Jubal

References

 Comay, Joan, Who's Who in the Old Testament, Oxford University Press, 1971, 
 Lockyer, Herbert, All the men of the Bible, Zondervan Publishing House (Grand Rapids, Michigan), 1958
 Lockyer, Herbert, All the women of the Bible, Zondervan Publishing 1988, 
 Lockyer, Herbert, All the Divine Names and Titles in the Bible, Zondervan Publishing 1988,  
 Tischler, Nancy M., All things in the Bible: an encyclopedia of the biblical world , Greenwood Publishing, Westport, Conn.: 2006 

Y